The 2001–02 season was Manchester United's tenth season in the Premier League, their 100th season in league football, and their 27th consecutive season in the top division of English football. The second full season of the new millennium was a great disappointment for the Red Devils in comparison to the previous three years. The club finished in third place in the Premier League, their lowest finish in the history of the Premier League at the time, and they were knocked out of the FA Cup in the fourth round. League Cup success was not expected, and the club duly obliged by playing what was effectively a reserve team against a strong Arsenal side in the third round, the day after both teams were on League duty. United's best success in the 2001–02 season came in the UEFA Champions League, in which they reached the semi-finals before being knocked out by Bayer Leverkusen on away goals. Ultimately, United's failure to win anything boiled down a dismal run of form in November and early December when they suffered five defeats in seven league games, including three defeats in a row against Arsenal, Chelsea and West Ham United in December. They also lost six home games in the Premier League, their worst home record since the 1977–78 season. They only lost three more league games all season, but that terrible form earlier in the campaign counted against United for the rest of the campaign and they finished 10 points behind champions Arsenal (who sealed their crown by beating United 1–0 at Old Trafford in the penultimate game of the season) and three points behind runners-up Liverpool.

Before the season began, Sir Alex Ferguson had announced his intention to retire from football at the end of the season, and the club began the process of trying to find a successor for the most successful manager in their history. However, Ferguson went back on his decision to retire, citing his wife and three sons as the reason for the u-turn.

Assistant manager Steve McClaren left the club before the start of the season to become the manager of Middlesbrough. Youth team coach and former player Mike Phelan was promoted to first-team coach and took over some of the assistant manager's responsibilities, but McClaren was not replaced until the summer of 2002, when Carlos Queiroz was appointed the new assistant manager.

Winger Ryan Giggs was honoured with a testimonial match against Celtic, having now been at United for more than a decade.

£19 million striker Ruud van Nistelrooy did what was expected of him by scoring 36 goals in all competitions and collecting the PFA Player of the Year award, but £28.1 million national record signing Juan Sebastián Verón was a major disappointment in midfield, though it was in defence where United were at their weakest following the shock departure of Jaap Stam to Lazio just after the start of the season, and the surprise acquisition of 35-year-old Frenchman Laurent Blanc as his successor.

2001–02 was the final season at Old Trafford for veteran players Denis Irwin and Ronny Johnsen after 12 and six years at the club respectively. Also on the way out of the club were goalkeeper Raimond van der Gouw and striker Dwight Yorke. Striker Andy Cole left United after seven years when he sealed a transfer to Blackburn Rovers at the end of December.

Pre-season and friendlies

On 4 August 2001, United played two friendly matches simultaneously, against Wrexham (Brian Flynn's and Kevin Reeves' testimonial) and Hereford United. The first-team squad was split in two, with Jimmy Ryan taking charge at Hereford.

FA Charity Shield

Premier League

FA Cup

League Cup

UEFA Champions League

Group stage

Second group stage

Knockout phase

Squad statistics

Transfers
United's first departures of the 2001–02 season were midfield duo Jonathan Greening and Mark Wilson, who both signed for Middlesbrough on 9 August. On 27 August, Jaap Stam was controversially sold to Lazio for a fee of £16.5 million, while on 8 November, Jesper Blomqvist signed for Everton.

Arriving in the summer transfer window were Northern Irish goalkeeper Roy Carroll, Dutch forward Ruud van Nistelrooy, Argentinian midfielder Juan Sebastián Verón and French defender Laurent Blanc. Out of these players, only van Nistelrooy made much of an impact, staying at United until 2006 and scoring 150 goals in 219 appearances for United.

Departing during the winter transfer window were forward Andy Cole, who left United after six years, and Michael Clegg, who signed for Oldham Athletic on a free transfer. Paul Rachubka left United on 20 May for Charlton Athletic. Goalkeeper Raimond van der Gouw signed for West Ham United on 28 June on a free transfer, while on 30 June, defenders Denis Irwin, Ronny Johnsen and Ronnie Wallwork were released.

Luke Steele joined United on 11 May for a fee of £500,000.

In

Out

Loan in

Loan out

References

2001-02
2001–02 FA Premier League by team